Woodstock is a town in the Canadian province of Newfoundland and Labrador. The town had a population of 195 in 2021, up from 190 in the Canada 2016 Census.

Demographics 

See also
 List of cities and towns in Newfoundland and Labrador

References

Towns in Newfoundland and Labrador